Badr Haji Al-Halabeej (born 19 December 1967) is a Kuwaiti former footballer who participated in the 1996 and 2000 AFC Asian Cup.

Honours

Personal
 Best Arab player in 1994
 Best player of the 1998 Arab Nations Cup in Qatar
 Best player of the 1998 Gulf Cup of Nations in Bahrain

Club
 Winner four times the Kuwaiti Premier League in 1986, 1987, 1994, 1996 with Kazma SC
 Winner twice the Kuwait Emir Cup in 1982, 1984, 1990, 1995 with Kazma SC
 Winner once the Kuwait Crown Prince Cup in 1995 with Kazma SC
 Winner once the Saudi Crown Prince Cup in 1999 with Al Shabab FC
 Winner twice the Gulf Club Champions Cup in 1987, 1995 with Kazma SC

National
 Winner twice of the Gulf Cup of Nations 1996 in Oman and 1998 in Bahrain
 Third place in the 1998 Arab Nations Cup in Qatar

References

External links

1967 births
Living people
Kuwaiti footballers
Kuwaiti expatriate footballers
Kuwait international footballers
1996 AFC Asian Cup players
Association football midfielders
Expatriate footballers in Saudi Arabia
Asian Games medalists in football
Footballers at the 1998 Asian Games
Saudi Professional League players
Al-Shabab FC (Riyadh) players
Asian Games silver medalists for Kuwait
Medalists at the 1998 Asian Games
Kuwaiti expatriate sportspeople in Saudi Arabia
Kazma SC players
Kuwait Premier League players